Connecticut Airport Authority is a quasi-public agency established in 2011 to develop, improve, and operate Bradley International Airport and the state’s five general aviation airports (Danielson Airport, Groton–New London Airport, Hartford–Brainard Airport, Waterbury–Oxford Airport, and Windham Airport.

References

Airport operators of the United States
Quasi-public agencies in Connecticut
Airport Authority
Government agencies established in 2011
2011 establishments in Connecticut